Morisonia is a genus of flowering plants in the family Capparaceae, found across the Americas from the United States to Argentina. It was recently enlarged with New World Capparis species due to existing taxonomic instability. They tend to be shrubs or small trees.

Species
Currently accepted species include:

Morisonia alainiana (Cornejo & Iltis) Christenh. & Byng
Morisonia americana L.
Morisonia amplissima (Lam.) Christenh. & Byng
Morisonia angustifolia (Kunth) Christenh. & Byng
Morisonia antonensis (Woodson) Christenh. & Byng
Morisonia asperifolia (C.Presl) Christenh. & Byng
Morisonia atamisquea (Kuntze) Christenh. & Byng
Morisonia bahiana (Cornejo & Iltis) Christenh. & Byng
Morisonia bonifaziana (Cornejo & Iltis) Christenh. & Byng
Morisonia brasiliana (DC.) Christenh. & Byng
Morisonia calciphila (Standl. & Steyerm.) Christenh. & Byng
Morisonia coimbrana (Cornejo & Iltis) Christenh. & Byng
Morisonia crotonoides (Kunth) Christenh. & Byng
Morisonia cuatrecasasiana (Dugand) Christenh. & Byng
Morisonia cynophallophora (L.) Christenh. & Byng
Morisonia declinata (Vell.) Christenh. & Byng
Morisonia detonsa (Triana & Planch.) Christenh. & Byng
Morisonia didymobotrys (Ruiz & Pav. ex DC.) Christenh. & Byng
Morisonia discolor (Donn.Sm.) Christenh. & Byng
Morisonia dolichopoda (Helwig) Christenh. & Byng
Morisonia domingensis (Spreng. ex DC.) Christenh. & Byng
Morisonia dressleri (Cornejo & Iltis) Christenh. & Byng
Morisonia ecuadorica (Iltis) Christenh. & Byng
Morisonia ferruginea (L.) Christenh. & Byng
Morisonia filipes (Donn.Sm.) Christenh. & Byng
Morisonia flexuosa L.
Morisonia frondosa (Jacq.) Christenh. & Byng
Morisonia grandiflora (Cornejo & Iltis) Christenh. & Byng
Morisonia hastata (Jacq.) Christenh. & Byng
Morisonia heterophylla (Ruiz & Pav. ex DC.) Christenh. & Byng
Morisonia heydeana (Donn.Sm.) Christenh. & Byng
Morisonia humilis (Hassl.) Christenh. & Byng
Morisonia incana (Kunth) Christenh. & Byng
Morisonia isthmensis (Eichler) Christenh. & Byng
Morisonia lindeniana (Cornejo & Iltis) Christenh. & Byng
Morisonia linearis (Jacq.) Christenh. & Byng
Morisonia lineata (Dombey ex Pers.) Christenh. & Byng
Morisonia longifolia (Mart.) Christenh. & Byng
Morisonia lundellii (Standl.) Christenh. & Byng
Morisonia macrantha (Standl.) Christenh. & Byng
Morisonia macrophylla (Kunth) Christenh. & Byng
Morisonia martiana (Cornejo) Christenh. & Byng
Morisonia matogrossensis (Pilg.) Christenh. & Byng
Morisonia megalosperma (Cornejo & Iltis) Christenh. & Byng
Morisonia mirifica (Standl.) Christenh. & Byng
Morisonia mollicella (Standl.) Christenh. & Byng
Morisonia morenoi (Cornejo & Iltis) Christenh. & Byng
Morisonia multiflora Triana & Planch.
Morisonia oblongifolia Britton
Morisonia odoratissmia (Jacq.) Christenh. & Byng
Morisonia osmantha (Diels) Christenh. & Byng
Morisonia pachaca (Kunth) Christenh. & Byng
Morisonia panamensis (Iltis) Christenh. & Byng
Morisonia paradoxa (Jacq.) Christenh. & Byng
Morisonia peruviana (Spruce ex Eichler) Christenh. & Byng
Morisonia petiolaris (Kunth) Christenh. & Byng
Morisonia pittieri (Standl.) Christenh. & Byng
Morisonia polyantha (Triana & Planch.) Christenh. & Byng
Morisonia pringlei (Briq.) Christenh. & Byng
Morisonia pulcherrima (Jacq.) Christenh. & Byng
Morisonia quina (J.F.Macbr.) Christenh. & Byng
Morisonia quintanarooensis (Iltis & Cornejo) Christenh. & Byng
Morisonia quiriguensis (Standl.) Christenh. & Byng
Morisonia retusa (Griseb.) Christenh. & Byng
Morisonia salicifolia (Griseb.) Christenh. & Byng
Morisonia scabrida (Kunth) Christenh. & Byng
Morisonia sclerophylla (Iltis & Cornejo) Christenh. & Byng
Morisonia sessilis (Banks ex DC.) Christenh. & Byng
Morisonia singularis (R.Rankin) Christenh. & Byng
Morisonia sola (J.F.Macbr.) Christenh. & Byng
Morisonia speciosa (Griseb.) Christenh. & Byng
Morisonia sprucei (Eichler) Christenh. & Byng
Morisonia stenopetala (Urb.) Christenh. & Byng
Morisonia steyermarkii (Standl.) Christenh. & Byng
Morisonia tafallana (Cornejo, Iltis & Cerón) Christenh. & Byng
Morisonia tarapotensis (Eichler) Christenh. & Byng
Morisonia tenuisiliqua (Jacq.) Christenh. & Byng
Morisonia tuxtlensis (Cornejo & Iltis) Christenh. & Byng
Morisonia tweedieana (Eichler) Christenh. & Byng
Morisonia urbani (Eggers) Christenh. & Byng
Morisonia valerabella (Iltis, T.Ruíz & G.S.Bunting) Christenh. & Byng
Morisonia verrucosa (Jacq.) Christenh. & Byng
Morisonia yco (Mart.) Christenh. & Byng
Morisonia yunckeri (Standl.) Christenh. & Byng

Species formerly accepted of the genus
Morisonia nemorosa (Jacq.) Christenh. & Byng, a synonym of Cynophalla flexuosa

References

Capparaceae
Brassicales genera